U.S. Città di Palermo played the season 2006–07 in the Serie A league. It has been the third season in a row for Palermo in the top division of Italy.

Review and events

Palermo initially ended the 2005–06 season in eighth place, and thus was expected to play the UEFA Intertoto Cup 2006. Meanwhile, Francesco Guidolin was re-hired at Giuseppe Papadopulo's place. However, due to the Serie A scandal of 2006, the FIGC had stated they would not enter Palermo into the Intertoto Cup. 

After the verdicts penalized numerous clubs, Palermo's overall position for that season was elevated to 5th, meaning they had qualified for the 2006–2007 UEFA Cup. In the transfer window, Palermo spent millions adding players to their squad, including Aimo Diana, Mark Bresciano, Fábio Simplício and Amauri, but sold World Cup winner Fabio Grosso to Internazionale. Several football experts and pundits tipped Palermo to do well in the season ahead, including Alessandro Del Piero.

They started well by knocking out English side West Ham United in the UEFA Cup. However, this time around the group stage proved to be more difficult than the previous year, and Palermo finished last in a group that contained Celta de Vigo, Eintracht Frankfurt, Fenerbahçe SK and Newcastle United.

For the first time in its history Palermo sat on top of the Serie A table in September 2006 after beating Catania 5–3 at home in the Sicilian derby. Another notable victory, was a 2–0 away win to AC Milan at San Siro stadium. A serious knee injury for Amauri caused Palermo to replace the powerful striker, and Uruguayan Edinson Cavani and Polish Radosław Matusiak were signed in the Winter transfer market, together with midfielders Maurizio Ciaramitaro and Guillermo Giacomazzi.

On 2 February 2007 Palermo was involved in a controversial away Sicilian derby match which was suspended for 30 minutes during the second half after some tear gas explosions from outside the stadium, used by the police to minimize hooliganism outside the Massimino Stadium, drifted onto the playing area. After the match, violence went on and policeman Filippo Raciti was killed by a small explosive launched by a Catania hooligan. This led Commissioner Luca Pancalli to suspend indefinitely football leagues and national team matches in the whole country. Following these events Palermo, which was clearly third-placed at the time, was not able to achieve a single victory, and dropped to sixth position in the Serie A. Maurizio Zamparini, the chairman, became more and more critical of Guidolin, who was finally sacked on 23 April following a 3–4 home defeat to third-last placed Parma which extended the run of poor results to 11 games without a single win. Assistant coach Renzo Gobbo and youth team coach Rosario Pergolizzi were subsequently appointed as caretaker coaches at Guidolin's place. On their debut match, Pergolizzi and Gobbo led Palermo to a 2–1 away win at Livorno, finally ending the negative run. The victory was however followed by two further defeats, including an upset 3–2 away loss against last-placed team Ascoli, already relegated to Serie B, which left the rosanero in seventh place, the last UEFA Cup spot, only three points above Atalanta. The events led Zamparini to reappoint Guidolin as head coach for the remaining two matches. Guidolin's return brought two victories, to Siena and Udinese, clinched fifth place in the final table, qualification to the UEFA Cup 2007-08 for the third consecutive time and broke its previous record of 53 points of two years before.

Match results

Serie A

UEFA Cup

Coppa Italia

Player details

|-
|colspan="12"|Players sold or loaned out during the January transfer market:

|}

January transfer market bids
In

Out

See also
2006–07 in Italian football
2007 Catania football violence

References

Palermo F.C. seasons
Palermo